The Portrait of Ugolino Martelli is a painting by the Italian artist Agnolo di Cosimo, known as Bronzino, executed in 1536 or 1537. It is housed in the Gemäldegalerie, Berlin, Germany. The work is signed BRONZO FIORENTINO on the edge of the table top.

Ugolino Martelli (1519-1592) was a Florentine aristocrat, humanist, and linguist, whose palace can be seen in the background of the picture. A marble David of the family's collection appears in the background. It was attributed at the time to Donatello, while it is now ascribed to Antonio or Bernardo Rossellino and dated between about 1461 to 1479. The earliest reference to the sculpture is in the private records of Luigi d'Ugolino Martelli (Ugolino's grandfather), in an inventory of his possessions begun in 1488. It is now in the National Gallery in Washington D.C. The David was a traditional symbol of the Florentine freedom, and could be an allusion to Martelli adherence to the city's Republican party.

On the scholar's worktable a copy of Homer's Iliad, in Greek, can be seen turned towards the reader. It is open at the beginning of the ninth book, the Embassy to Achilles. A second book, of which only a corner is visible, is inscribed MARO, indicating the Latin poet Publius Vergilius Maro better known as Virgil. Ugolino's left arm is supported by a work by Pietro Bembo, whose sonnets were written in the vernacular. Ugolino lectured on Bembo and had met him by 1539.

Another portrait of Ugolino Martelli is housed in the National Gallery of Art in Washington D.C. It was attributed to Pontormo, and is now believed to be by a closely associated painter.

References

Martelli, Ugolino
Martelli, Ugolino
1530s paintings
Martelli, Ugolino
Martelli, Ugolino
Martelli, Ugolino
Collections of the National Gallery of Art
Paintings in the Gemäldegalerie, Berlin
Books in art